Macropoides crassipes is a species of beetles of the scarab beetle family.

Description
Head, pronotum and elytra are completely yellow, with brown legs. Larvae develop in rotten logs. Adults can be found from March to December.

Distribution and habitat

References
Encyclopaedia of Life
Catalogue of Life
GBIF
Generic Guide to New World Scarab Beetles

Rutelinae
Taxa named by George Henry Horn
Beetles described in 1866